Cassa di Risparmio di Asti known as Banca CR Asti or just Banca di Asti, is an Italian saving bank based in Asti, Piedmont. It serves Piedmont and Lombardy regions.

History
The bank was found on 25 January 1842 in Asti, in the Kingdom of Sardinia. Due to Legge Amato, on 24 June 1992 the bank was split into Cassa di Risparmio di Asti S.p.A. and Fondazione Cassa di Risparmio di Asti (gazetted on 17 July). In 1996 the banking foundation sold part of the shares to private citizens. In 1999 a further 20% was sold to the Deutsche Bank (via its subsidiary Deutsche Bank S.p.A.), which was acquired by Banca Popolare di Milano (via subsidiary Banca di Legnano) in 2004, for €93 million. The banking foundation retained 51.05% shares prior 2008 capital increase. Prior to 2013 capital increases, the banking foundation held 50.45% shares, which was decreased to 50.42% on 28 March 2013. The ownership was further diluted due to another capital increases in 2015.

In December 2012 the bank acquired 60.42% shares of Cassa di Risparmio di Biella e Vercelli, another Piedmontese bank, from Banca Monte dei Paschi di Siena for €206 million.

Subsidiary
 Cassa di Risparmio di Biella e Vercelli (Biverbanca)

See also
other bank of the provincial capital of Piedmont
 Cassa di Risparmio di Alessandria, now part of Banco BPM
 Cassa di Risparmio di Cuneo, now part of UBI Banca
 Cassa di Risparmio di Torino, now part of UniCredit

References

External links
  
 Official website of the Fondazione Cassa di Risparmio di Asti 

Banks established in 1842
1842 establishments in the Kingdom of Sardinia
Banks of Italy
Companies based in Piedmont
Asti
Privately held companies of Italy
Italian companies established in 1842